Rare Flight is a double compilation released in 1988 on Pair Records during the 40th anniversary of Atlantic Records. This release compiles Iron Butterfly's first and third albums: Heavy and Ball.

Track listing
 "Possession"
 "Unconscious Power"
 "Get Out of My Life, Woman" (Allen Toussaint)
 "Gentle As It May Seem"
 "You Can't Win"
 "So-Lo"
 "Look For The Sun"
 "Fields Of Sun"
 "Stamped Ideas"
 "Iron Butterfly Theme"
 "In The Time Of Our Lives"
 "Soul Experience"
 "Lonely Boy"
 "Real Fright"
 "In The Crowds"
 "It Must Be Love"
 "Her Favorite Style"
 "Filled With Fear"
 "Belda Beast"
 Tracks 1–10 released 1968, recorded 1967
 Tracks 11–19 released  1969, recorded 1968

Band members
Doug Ingle – organ, vocals: All tracks; lead vocals: Tracks 1–3, 5, 7, 8, 11–18
Ron Bushy – drums: All tracks
Danny Weis – guitars: Tracks 1–10
Darryl DeLoach – tambourine, vocals: Tracks 1–10; lead vocals: Tracks 4, 6, 7, 9
Jerry Penrod – bass, vocals: Tracks 1–10; lead vocals: Track 7
Erik Brann – guitars, vocals: Tracks 11–19; lead vocals: Track 19
Lee Dorman – bass, vocals: Tracks 11–19

Iron Butterfly compilation albums
1988 compilation albums
Atlantic Records compilation albums